The golden-billed saltator (Saltator aurantiirostris) is a species of saltator in the family Thraupidae.
It is found in Argentina, Bolivia, Brazil, Chile, Paraguay, Peru, and Uruguay; also the regions of the southern pantanal, along the Paraguay River.
Its natural habitats are subtropical or tropical dry forests, subtropical or tropical dry shrubland, subtropical or tropical high-altitude shrubland, and heavily degraded former forest.

References

External links
Golden-billed Saltator videos on the Internet Bird Collection
Golden-billed Saltator photo gallery VIREO

Saltator
Birds of Peru
Birds of Argentina
Birds of Paraguay
Birds of Uruguay
Birds of Bolivia
Birds of Brazil
Birds of the Pantanal
Birds described in 1817
Taxa named by Louis Jean Pierre Vieillot
Taxonomy articles created by Polbot